The Free Soil Party was organized for the 1848 US election to oppose further expansion of slavery into the western territories.  It included anti-slavery members of the Whigs, and drew much of its support anti-slavery Democrats, including former President Martin Van Buren. 

When the Whigs nominated slave owner Zachary Taylor for president, and took no position on the anti-slavery Wilmot Proviso, prominent Conscience Whigs including Henry Wilson and Charles Allen, withdrew from the party's national convention and issued a call for anti-slavery advocates to meet with the goal of forming a new party.  The party included prominent abolitionists such as Salmon P. Chase and John Parker Hale, and held its 1848 convention in Utica and Buffalo, New York.  On June 22, Van Buren defeated Hale by a 244-183 delegate count to capture the Free Soil nomination for president and Henry Dodge was nominated for Vice President. Governor Dodge, however, declined the honor - proud though he would be, as he said, to have his name under other circumstances associated with that of Van Buren. In August, the first National Free Soil Convention at Buffalo composed of Barnburners, Liberty men, and Anti-slavery Whigs endorsed Van Buren for President and nominated Charles Francis Adams Sr., the son and grandson of presidents, for Vice President.

Van Buren knew that the Free Soilers had no chance of winning; he hoped that his candidacy would split the Democratic vote and throw the election to the Whigs.  Van Buren pursued this strategy partly from personal animus towards Lewis Cass, whom he blamed for preventing him from obtaining the Democratic nomination in 1844, and dislike of the pro-slavery principle of popular sovereignty, which Cass championed.  Van Buren's plan proved successful; he obtained enough votes in New York to deny the state to Cass, which was enough to provide Taylor's margin of victory.

Free Soil party platform 
Among the positions adopted by the party in its convention were:

We…propose no interference by Congress with slavery within the limits of any state.
…it is the duty of the federal government to relieve itself of all responsibility for the existence or continuance of slavery wherever the government possesses constitutional power to legislate on that subject, and is thus responsible for its existence.
…we accept the issue which the slave power has forced upon us; and to their demand for more slave states and more slave territory, our calm but final answer is: No more slave states and no more slave territory.

Liberty Party nomination 

Despite their significant showing in the prior presidential election, certain events would conspire to remove the Liberty Party from political significance.

Initially, the nomination was to be decided in the fall of 1847 at a Convention in Buffalo, New York. There, Senator John P. Hale was nominated over Gerrit Smith, brother-in-law to the party's previous nominee James G. Birney. Leicester King, a former judge and state senator in Ohio, was nominated to be Hale's running mate. Anti-slavery Democrats and Whigs, disappointed with their respective nominees, would form a new movement in conjunction with members of the Liberty Party such as John Hale and Salmon Chase to form the Free Soil Party that summer. At this point, both Hale and King withdrew in favor of a Free Soil ticket led by former President Martin Van Buren, and the great majority of members of the Liberty Party followed. A small faction refused to support Van Buren for the presidency, however. They held another convention in June 1848 as the rump "National Liberty Party." Gerrit Smith was nominated almost unanimously, with Charles Foote, a religious minister from Michigan as his running mate.

References

Navigation 

1848 United States presidential election
Martin Van Buren
1848 conferences